Tagetes mandonii is a Bolivian species of marigolds in the family Asteraceae. It is native to La Paz Department and Cochabamba Department in Bolivia.

Tagetes mandonii is an erect herb with opposite leaves. Stem is thin. Leaves are highly dissected. Flower heads are yellow, each containing 6 ray florets and 11 disc florets.

References

External links

mandonii
Endemic flora of Bolivia
Plants described in 1889